Charles Brown Jr. (born February 2, 1997) is an American professional basketball player for the Delaware Blue Coats of the NBA G League. He played college basketball for the Saint Joseph's Hawks.

Early life and high school
Brown was born in Philadelphia, Pennsylvania and grew up in the Northeast section of the city. He initially attended Imhotep Institute Charter High School before transferring to George Washington High School before his junior year. Before his senior year he played for Philly Pride in the Amateur Athletic Union. As a senior, Brown averaged 18.4 points per game and was named the MVP Philadelphia Public League's B Division. He verbally committed to West Chester University but was offered and accepted a scholarship to Saint Joseph's University. Brown opted to prep for a fifth year at the St. Thomas More School in Oakdale, Connecticut, where he helped the team to a 31–6 record and the National Prep Championship game.

College career

As a freshman at Saint Joseph's, he started 30 of the Hawks' 31 games and averaged 12.8 points, five rebounds, and 1.1 assists while shooting 38.4 percent from behind the arc and 81.9 percent from the free-throw line. Brown was named to the Atlantic 10 Conference All-Rookie team. He was named third team all conference entering his true sophomore season, but missed the entirety of the year after being forced to use a medical redshirt after breaking his wrist in preseason practice.

As a redshirt sophomore, Brown led the Atlantic 10 with 19.0 points per game and averaged 6.2 rebounds and 1.5 assists over 32 games earning him second team All-Atlantic 10 and first team All-Big 5 honors. In total, Brown scored 1,006 points and grabbed 352 rebounds in 63 games during his college career. Following the end of the redshirt sophomore season, Brown declared for the 2019 NBA Draft with the intent on signing an agent, therefore forgoing his final two seasons of eligibility.

Professional career

Atlanta Hawks (2019–2020)
After going unselected in the draft, Brown agreed to a two-way contract with the Atlanta Hawks on June 21, 2019, and officially signed on July 1, 2019. Brown made his NBA debut on November 6, 2019, against the Chicago Bulls, playing four minutes with two points and a rebound in a 113–93 loss.

Iowa Wolves (2021)
On December 11, 2020, Brown was signed by the Minnesota Timberwolves, but was waived eight days later. On January 25, 2021, he signed with the Iowa Wolves of the NBA G League where he appeared in 13 games and averaged 12.5 points, 5.5 rebounds, 1.9 assists and a team-high 1.69 steals in 30.0 minutes while shooting 44.7 percent from the field.

Oklahoma City Thunder (2021)
On April 25, 2021, Brown signed a 10-day contract with the Oklahoma City Thunder. On May 5, he signed a second 10-day contract and 10 days later, he signed a multi-year contract.

On September 26, 2021, Brown was waived by the Thunder.

Delaware Blue Coats (2021)
On October 20, 2021, Brown's rights were traded from the Iowa Wolves to Delaware Blue Coats in exchange for Raphiael Putney, and five days later, he signed with the Blue Coats. In 11 games, he averaged 16.8 points, 8.1 rebounds, 1.6 assists, 1.6 steals, and 0.9 blocks.

Dallas Mavericks (2021–2022)
On December 23, 2021, Brown signed a 10-day contract with the Dallas Mavericks. He appeared in three games for the Mavericks.

Philadelphia 76ers (2022)
On January 2, 2022, Brown was reacquired and activated by the Delaware Blue Coats. The following day, Brown signed a 10-day contract with the Philadelphia 76ers. On January 11, he signed a two-way contract with the 76ers.  On January 19, 2022, Brown made his first NBA start at home for the 76ers against the Orlando Magic of Orlando, FL.

Return to Delaware (2022–present)
On November 3, 2022, Brown was named to the opening night roster for the Delaware Blue Coats.

Personal life
Brown's father, Charlie Brown Sr., played college basketball at North Carolina A&T for two years and then professionally overseas until he suffered a career-ending Achilles tendon rupture.

Career statistics

NBA

Regular season

|-
| style="text-align:left;"|
| style="text-align:left;"|Atlanta
| 10 || 0 || 4.0 || .316 || .333 || 1.000 || .4 || .2 || .2 || .2 || 2.0
|-
| style="text-align:left;"| 
| style="text-align:left;"| Oklahoma City
| 9 || 1 || 16.9 || .302 || .238 || .900 || 1.9 || 1.0 || .4 || .2 || 4.4
|-
| style="text-align:left;"| 
| style="text-align:left;"| Dallas
| 3 || 0 || 5.0 || .200 || .000 ||  || .3 || .3 || .7 || .3 || .7
|-
| style="text-align:left;"| 
| style="text-align:left;"| Philadelphia
| 19 || 2 || 8.5 || .265 || .111 || .900 || 1.6 || .3 || .4 || .2 || 1.5
|- class="sortbottom"
| style="text-align:center;" colspan="2"|Career
| 41 || 3 || 9.0 || .287 || .214 || .920 || 1.3 || .4 || .4 || .2 || 2.2

College

|-
| style="text-align:left;"| 2016–17
| style="text-align:left;"| Saint Joseph's
| 31|| 30 || 34.2 || .375 || .384 || .819 || 5.0 || 1.1 || .8 || .7 || 12.8
|-
| style="text-align:left;"|2017–18
| style="text-align:left;"|Saint Joseph's
| style="text-align:center;" colspan="11"|Did not play – Medical Redshirt
|-
| style="text-align:left;"| 2018–19
| style="text-align:left;"| Saint Joseph's
| 32 || 31 || 35.6 || .430 || .356 || .845 || 6.2 || 1.5 || 1.1 || .8 || 19.0
|- class="sortbottom"
| style="text-align:center;" colspan="2"| Career
| 63|| 61 || 34.9 || .407 || .370 || .836 || 5.6 || 1.3 || .9 || .7 || 16.0

References

External links

Saint Joseph's Hawks bio

1997 births
Living people
21st-century African-American sportspeople
African-American basketball players
American men's basketball players
Atlanta Hawks players
Basketball players from Philadelphia
College Park Skyhawks players
Dallas Mavericks players
Delaware Blue Coats players
Iowa Wolves players
Oklahoma City Thunder players
Philadelphia 76ers players
Saint Joseph's Hawks men's basketball players
Shooting guards
Small forwards
Undrafted National Basketball Association players
United States men's national basketball team players